Olusegun Adeniyi (born 6 November 1965) is a Nigerian journalist, current chair of the editorial board of ThisDay newspapers and a former presidential spokesman to the late President Umaru Musa Yar'Adua.

Early life and education
Adeniyi was born in Ile-Ife, Nigeria. He is a 1989 BSc holder in International Relations from Obafemi Awolowo University, Ile-Ife with a 1997 Masters in International Law and Diplomacy (MILD) from the University of Lagos, and he was also a Fellow at the Weatherhead Centre for International Affairs, Harvard University in 2010/2011 academic session. He conducted his research on the factors that shape incumbent presidential elections in Africa.

Career
He began his journalism career as a Staff Reporter with The Guardian Newspapers in December 1990. In April 1992, he left  to join the now rested African Concord magazine as a Senior Staff Writer and in September of the same year, he was appointed the magazine’s Abuja Bureau Chief with accreditation to cover the State House.

Adeniyi, who joined ThisDay newspaper in January 1999 as Deputy Editor of the Saturday newspaper, rose to become editor of the Sunday THISDAY and in August 2005, he was appointed the editor of the THISDAY title paper. On 30 May 2007, he was appointed by the late President Umaru Musa Yar’Adua to be his Special Adviser on Media and Publicity, a position he occupied until Yar’Adua demise on 5 May 2010. He has since written about his experience working for the deceased president.
 
In July 2007, Adeniyi attended the International Visitor Leadership Programme organised by the US State Department. He was also a Fellow at the Weatherhead Centre for International Affairs, Harvard University in 2010/2011 academic session.

He is currently the chair of the editorial board of ThisDay newspapers. A fellow of the Nigeria Leadership Initiative (NLI), Adeniyi is also a founding member of the National Stakeholder Working Group of the Nigeria Extractive Industries Transparency Initiative (NEITI).

Personal life
Adeniyi is married with three children.

Books
Adeniyi is the author of the following books:
The Last 100 Days of Abacha
Abiola’s Travails
Fortress on Quicksand 
POLITRICKS: National Assembly under Military Dictatorship 
Power, Politics and Death: A front-row account of Nigeria under the late President Yar’Adua
Against the Run of Play: How an incumbent president was defeated in Nigeria
 From Fry Pan To Fire

Awards
1992 Jakande Prize or Political Reporter of the Year at Nigeria Media Merit Awards (NMMA)

References

1965 births
Living people
Yoruba journalists
Nigerian newspaper journalists
Obafemi Awolowo University alumni
University of Lagos alumni
People from Ife
Nigerian editors